Doryxylon is a monotypic plant genus in the family Euphorbiaceae first described as a genus in 1857. The sole species is Doryxylon spinosum. It is found on the Island of Luzon in the Philippines and in the Lesser Sunda Islands of southern Indonesia.

Formerly included
Doryxylon albicans (Blume) N.P.Balakr. syn of Sumbaviopsis albicans (Blume) J.J.Sm.

References

Chrozophoreae
Monotypic Euphorbiaceae genera
Flora of the Lesser Sunda Islands
Flora of Luzon
Taxa named by Heinrich Zollinger